Helmut Hamann (31 August 1912 – 22 June 1941) was a German athlete from Berlin who competed mainly in the 400 metres.

Hamann competed for Germany in the 1936 Summer Olympics held in Berlin, Germany in the 4 x 400 metre relay where he won the bronze medal with his team mates Friedrich von Stülpnagel, Harry Voigt and Rudolf Harbig.

Hamann was killed in Siedliszcze in Poland during fighting on the Eastern Front of World War II.

References

1912 births
1941 deaths
Athletes (track and field) at the 1936 Summer Olympics
German male sprinters
German military personnel killed in World War II
Olympic bronze medalists for Germany
Olympic athletes of Germany
Athletes from Berlin
European Athletics Championships medalists
Medalists at the 1936 Summer Olympics
Olympic bronze medalists in athletics (track and field)